Andrew Anthony Rymsha (born December 10, 1968) is a Canadian former professional ice hockey player who played six games with the Quebec Nordiques of the National Hockey League during the 1991–92 season. The rest of his career, which lasted from 1990 to 2005, was spent in various minor leagues and in Europe.

Career statistics

Regular season and playoffs

External links
 

1968 births
Living people
Buffalo Wings (inline hockey) players
Canadian ice hockey right wingers
Ice hockey people from Ontario
Asiago Hockey 1935 players
Bracknell Bees players
Detroit Falcons (CoHL) players
Flint Generals (CoHL) players
Halifax Citadels players
HC Ajoie players
Kaufbeurer Adler players
Krefeld Pinguine players
New Haven Nighthawks players
New Jersey Rockin' Rollers players
Peoria Rivermen (IHL) players
Portland Rage players
Quebec Nordiques players
St. Louis Blues draft picks
San Francisco Spiders players
Schwenninger Wild Wings players
Sportspeople from St. Catharines
Starbulls Rosenheim players
Wiener EV players